Meconopsis villosa, the Himalayan woodland-poppy, is an ornamental poppy, which is native of Nepal. The species was placed in the genus Cathcartia erected by J.D. Hooker to honour J.F. Cathcart, an Indian civil servant and amateur botanist who collected and hired native artists to illustrate the flowers of the Himalayas. It was transferred to Meconopsis by George Taylor in 1934. In 2017, it was suggested that the genus Cathcartia should be revived, and this species again treated as Cathcartia villosa.

References

 Grey-Wilson, C.  (1993) Poppies: The poppy family in the wild and in cultivation. (Poppies) 81. [accepts; lists as C. villosa Hook.f. ex Hook.].
 Grierson, A. J. C. & D. J. Long. (1984–) Flora of Bhutan including a record of plants from Sikkim. (F Bhutan) [accepts; lists as C. villosa Hook.].
 Hara, H. et al. (1978–1982) An enumeration of the flowering plants of Nepal. (L Nepal) [lists as C. villosa Hook.f.].

External links
Meconopsis villosa
Meconopsis villosa
Meconopsis villosa

villosa
Endemic flora of Nepal
Taxa named by Asa Gray
Taxa named by William Jackson Hooker